Diaminopyrimidines (DAP) are a class of organic chemical compounds that include two amine groups on a  pyrimidine ring.

They include many dihydrofolate reductase inhibitor drugs (such as pyrimethamine, trimetrexate, and piritrexim and the antibiotics Iclaprim and trimethoprim).

Some have been patented as anti-cancer drugs.

See also
 2,4-Diaminopyrimidine
 4,5-Diaminopyrimidine

References

Aminopyrimidines